Academic study of Jewish mysticism, especially since Gershom Scholem's Major Trends in Jewish Mysticism (1941), draws distinctions between different forms of mysticism which were practiced in different eras of Jewish history. Of these, Kabbalah, which emerged in 12th-century Europe, is the most well known, but it is not the only typological form, nor was it the first form which emerged. Among the previous forms were Merkabah mysticism (c. 100 BCE – 1000 CE), and Ashkenazi Hasidim (early 13th century) around the time of the emergence of Kabbalah.

Kabbalah means "received tradition", a term which was previously used in other Judaic contexts, but the Medieval Kabbalists adopted it as a term for their own doctrine in order to express the belief that they were not innovating, but were merely revealing the ancient hidden esoteric tradition of the Torah. This issue has been crystalized until today by alternative views on the origin of the Zohar, the main text of Kabbalah, attributed to the circle of its central protagonist Rabbi Shimon Bar Yochai in the 2nd century CE, for opening up the study of Jewish Mysticism. Traditional Kabbalists regard it as originating in Tannaic times, redacting the Oral Torah, so do not make a sharp distinction between Kabbalah and early Rabbinic Jewish mysticism. Academic scholars regard it as a synthesis from the Middle Ages, when it appeared between the 13th-15th centuries, but assimilating and incorporating into itself earlier forms of Jewish mysticism, possible continuations of ancient esoteric traditions, as well as medieval philosophical elements.

The theosophical aspect of Kabbalah itself developed through two historical forms: "Medieval/Classic/Zoharic Kabbalah" (c.1175 – 1492 – 1570), and Lurianic Kabbalah (1569  – today) which assimilated Medieval Kabbalah into its wider system and became the basis for modern Jewish Kabbalah. After Luria, two new mystical forms popularised Kabbalah in Judaism: antinomian-heretical Sabbatean movements (1666 – 18th century), and Hasidic Judaism (1734 – today). In contemporary Judaism, the only main forms of Jewish mysticism which are practiced are esoteric Lurianic Kabbalah and its later commentaries, the variety of schools of Hasidic Judaism, and Neo-Hasidism (incorporating Neo-Kabbalah) in non-Orthodox Jewish denominations.

Two non-Jewish syncretic traditions also popularized Judaic Kabbalah through their incorporation as part of general Western esoteric culture from the Renaissance onwards: theological Christian Cabala (c. 15th  – 18th century) which adapted Judaic Kabbalistic doctrine to Christian belief, and its diverging occultist offshoot Hermetic Qabalah (c. 19th century – today) which became a main element in esoteric and magical societies and teachings. As separate traditions of development outside Judaism, drawing from, syncretically adapting, and different in nature and aims from Judaic mysticism, they are not listed on this page.

Three aims 
The Kabbalistic form of Jewish mysticism itself is divided into three general streams: the Theosophical/Speculative Kabbalah (seeking to understand and describe the divine realm), the Meditative/Ecstatic Kabbalah (seeking to achieve a mystical union with God), and the Practical/Magical Kabbalah (seeking to theurgically alter the divine realms and the World). These three different, but inter-relating, methods or aims of mystical involvement are also found throughout the other pre-Kabbalistic and post-Kabbalistic stages in Jewish mystical development, as three general typologies. As in Kabbalah, the same text can contain aspects of all three approaches, though the three streams often distill into three separate literatures under the influence of particular exponents or eras.

Within Kabbalah, the theosophical tradition is distinguished from many forms of mysticism in other religions by its doctrinal form as a mystical "philosophy" of Gnosis esoteric knowledge. Instead, the tradition of Meditative Kabbalah has similarity of aim, if not form, with usual traditions of general mysticism; to unite the individual intuitively with God. The tradition of theurgic Practical Kabbalah in Judaism, censored and restricted by mainstream Jewish Kabbalists, has similarities with non-Jewish Hermetic Qabalah magical Western Esotericism. However, as understood by Jewish Kabbalists, it is censored and forgotten in contemporary times because without the requisite purity and holy motive, it would degenerate into impure and forbidden magic. Consequently, it has formed a minor tradition in Jewish mystical history.

Historical forms

See also 
 four worlds
 Aggadah
 Gnosticism
 Jewish mythology
 Angels in Judaism
 Jewish mystical exegesis
 Kabbalah: Primary texts
 List of Jewish Kabbalists
 List of Jewish mysticism scholars
 Mandaeism

Notes

References 
 Biale, David Gershom Scholem: Kabbalah and counter-history, Harvard University Press
 Biale, David Not in the Heavens: The Tradition of Jewish Secular Thought, Princeton University Press (secularised jewish adaptions of Kabbalah)
 Brenner, Michael Prophets of the Past: Interpreters of Jewish History, Princeton University Press (mystical and other historiographies of judaism)
 Dan, Joseph Gershom Scholem and the Mystical Dimension of Jewish History,  NYU Press
 Dennis, Geoffrey W, The Encyclopedia of Jewish Myth, Magic & Mysticism, Llewellyn Publications 2nd edition illustrated 2016
 Heschel, Abraham Joshua Heavenly Torah: As Refracted through the Generations, edited and translated by Gordon Tucker, Bloomsbury Academic 2006 (existential-mystical exploration of revelation)
 Idel, Moshe Old Worlds, New Mirrors: On Jewish Mysticism and Twentieth-Century Thought, University of Pennsylvania Press (influence of jewish mysticism on secular jewish thinkers)
 Jacobs, Louis Jewish Mystical Testimonies, Schocken
 Kaplan, Aryeh Meditation and the Bible, Red Wheel/Weiser 1978 (exegesis of prophetic meditation techniques)
 Scholem, Gershom Major Trends in Jewish Mysticism, Schocken, (classic work, first pub.1941)
 Winkler, Gershon Magic of the Ordinary: Recovering the Shamanic in Judaism, North Atlantic Books

External links 

 Don Karr's Bibliographic Surveys of contemporary academic scholarship on all periods of Jewish mysticism
 Abraham Joshua Heschel's view of Rabbinic Judaism as aggadah and mystical experience
Devekut.com A compendium of Neo-Hasidic thought

 
Jewish theology
Jewish culture
Mysticism